Emily Elspeth Witt is an American mathematician, an associate professor and Keeler Intra-University Professor of mathematics at the University of Kansas. Her research involves commutative algebra, representation theory, and singularity theory.

Education and career
Witt is a 2005 graduate of the University of Chicago, where she majored in mathematics with a specialization in computer science. She completed her Ph.D. in 2011 at the University of Michigan. Her dissertation, Local cohomology and group actions, was supervised by Melvin Hochster.

After working as a Dunham Jackson Assistant Professor at the University of Minnesota from 2011 to 2014, and as a research assistant professor at the University of Utah from 2014 to 2015, she obtained a tenure-track assistant professorship at the University of Kansas in 2015. She was promoted to associate professor in 2020, and named Keeler Intra-University Professor for 2021–2022.

Recognition
Witt is the 2022–2023 winner of the Ruth I. Michler Memorial Prize of the Association for Women in Mathematics.

References

External links
Home page

Year of birth missing (living people)
Living people
American mathematicians
American women mathematicians
University of Chicago alumni
University of Michigan alumni
University of Kansas faculty